Miss International Myanmar or also known as Miss Myanmar International is a national competition to select Myanmar's representative to the Miss International pageant. This pageant organization is unrelated to the Miss Universe Myanmar, Miss World Myanmar , Miss Earth Myanmar or Miss Golden Land Myanmar.

History
Begins in 2012, Miss Myanmar International becomes a pioneer and an independent national pageant in Yangon, Myanmar. Starting from that year, Myanmar has participated for the first time since 1961 in an international beauty pageant as Nang Khin Zay Yar represented at the Miss International 2012.

Before creation Miss Myanmar or Miss Universe Myanmar pageant, the name of pageant was Miss Burma. Myanmar debut in 1961 with the name of Burma. In only 1961 era Myanmar competed at the Miss International pageant. Since 1962 the local pageant has been banned by the government in unknown reasons.

Titleholders

Winner

Winners by City/Town

Runner-up

International pageants

Miss International 

Notes : Miss Myanmar International 2012, Nang Khin Zay Yar participated in Miss International 2012 which is in Okinawa. This is the first time Myanmar competed in an international beauty pageant since 1961. The Final was on October 21, 2012. The reigning Miss Myanmar International 2014, Khin Wai Phyo Han did not compete at Miss International, since she did not meet the age requirements stipulated by the pageant. May Bayani Thaw was appointed to compete at Miss International 2014, She is Miss Myanmar International 2014 1st runner-up.

See also 
 Miss Burma (1947–1962)
 Miss Universe Myanmar
 Miss World Myanmar
 Miss Earth Myanmar
 Miss Supranational Myanmar
 Miss Grand Myanmar
 Mister Myanmar

References

External links
Official site

Myanmar
Recurring events established in 2012
Burmese awards
Beauty pageants in Myanmar